The men's 60 kg competition at the 2021 European Judo Championships was held on 16 April at the Altice Arena.

Results

Final

Repechage

Top half

Bottom half

References

External links
 

M60
European Judo Championships Men's Extra Lightweight